Ogonowski is a surname. Notable people with the surname include: 

Casmer P. Ogonowski (1923–2012), American politician
John Ogonowski (1951–2001), American pilot and agricultural activist